The Women's 4 × 100 m Freestyle Relay at the 2007 World Aquatics Championships took place on 25 March 2007 (prelims and final) at the Rod Laver Arena in Melbourne, Australia. The top-12 finishers from this race qualified for the event at the 2008 Olympics.

The existing records when the event started were:
World Record (WR):  3:35.22, Germany (Dallmann, Goetz, Steffen, Liebs), 31 July 2006 in Budapest, Hungary.
Championship Record (CR): 3:37.32, Australia (Henry, Mills, Reese, Lenton), Barcelona 2005 (Jul.24.2005)

Results

Final

Prelims

Heat 1

Heat 2

Heat 3

Heat 4

References

Swimming at the 2007 World Aquatics Championships
2007 in women's swimming